Gymnostoma australianum, commonly known as the Daintree pine or Daintree oak, is a species of small tree which is endemic to a restricted area of the Daintree tropical rainforests region, within the Wet Tropics of north-eastern Queensland, Australia. It is a member of the plant family Casuarinaceae, often named she-oaks, members of which are characterised by drooping equisetoid (meaning "to look like Equisetum") evergreen foliage, and separate male and female flowers (unisexual). Superficially they look like well known scale–leaved gymnosperm trees species, such as Cupressus in the northern hemisphere and Callitris in the southern hemisphere.
Within its restricted distribution in the Daintree rainforests region, Gymnostoma australianum usually grows in open, sunny, long-term rainforest gaps, ranging from the lowlands to the uplands, and from regularly flooded areas alongside water courses through to rocky or exposed, wet, cloudy, mountain top situations, with recorded collections from sea level to  altitude.

The roots have nitrogen-fixing nodules. When ripe the cone's numerous valves open to release the dark–coloured winged seeds 7–8 mm long.

Gymnostoma australianum has been given the conservation status of vulnerable under the Queensland government's Nature Conservation Act 1992.

References

australianum
Plants described in 1989
Endemic flora of Australia